The Atlanta Division is a railroad division operated by CSX Transportation in the U.S. states of Alabama, Georgia, Kentucky, Louisiana, Mississippi, South Carolina, Florida & Tennessee. The Atlanta Division has 18 subdivisions.

The subdivisions within the Atlanta Division are as follows:
 Atlanta Terminal Subdivision
 Abbeville Subdivision
 A&WP Subdivision
 Birmingham Mineral Subdivision
 Boyles Terminal Subdivision
 Camak Subdivision
 Cartersville Subdivision
 Etowah Subdivision
 Georgia Subdivision
 Gainesville Midland Subdivision
 KD Subdivision
 Lineville Subdivision
 M&M Subdivision
 Manchester Subdivision
 NO&M Subdivision
 PD Subdivision
 S&NA South Subdivision
 W&A Subdivision

See also
 List of CSX Transportation lines

References

CSX Transportation lines